Super Rugby Unlocked (known as Vodacom Super Rugby Unlocked for sponsorship reasons) was a professional rugby union competition played in South Africa from 10 October to 21 November 2020. Sponsored by communications company Vodacom, the tournament replaced the South African component of the incomplete 2020 Super Rugby season that was shut down in March of that year due to the COVID-19 pandemic.

Format
The seven participating teams played each other once, home or away. The top-placed team at the end of that seven-week round-robin was awarded the Super Rugby Unlocked title.

All tournament points were then carried forward to the 2020–21 Currie Cup, incorporating a return round-robin of matches followed by cup playoffs.

Tournament points in the Super Rugby Unlocked standings were awarded to teams as follows:
 4 points for a win.
 2 points for a draw. 
 1 bonus point for a loss in a match by seven points or under. 
 1 bonus point for scoring three tries more than the opponent.

Teams were ranked firstly by tournament points, then number of matches won, overall points difference (points scored less points conceded), number of tries scored, overall try difference (tries scored less tries conceded) and, if needed, coin toss.

Standings

Matches 
All matches for Super Rugby Unlocked are listed below:

Round 1

Round 2

Round 3 

On 4 November, this game was declared as a 0–0 draw due to the inability to reschedule the match.

Round 4

Round 5

Round 6 

Round 7 

 Notes:

Players

Player Statistics

Team rosters

See also

2020–21 Currie Cup Premier Division
Super Rugby
Super Rugby Aotearoa
Super Rugby AU

References

External links
 

 
 
Rugby union competitions for provincial teams
Fox Sports (Australian TV network)
2020 Super Rugby season
2020 in South African rugby union
2020 rugby union tournaments for clubs
Professional sports leagues in South Africa